Netropolitan Club was a social network created by composer and performer James Touchi-Peters, which launched September 15, 2014, and shutdown in November of 2014. It was designed for use exclusively by wealthy people. The website has a sign-up fee of U$9.000,00 and an annual fee of U$3.000,00 for renewing one's membership.

Shutdown after two months
After only approximately two months the site was deemed a failure.

Distinguishing features
Touchi-Peters founded Netropolitan Club so that wealthy people could have a place to network with other wealthy people, and share their activities as well as discuss their first world problems without alienating poorer people or engendering a backlash. With this goal in mind, the Netropolitan Club had the following distinguishing features:

 High membership fees (U$9.000,00 to join, U$3.000,00 to renew annually), that served to automatically filter out people who are not wealthy.
 Members were required to be over 21 and to use their real names.
 There was no third-party advertising. Members were to be able to post in an upcoming Classified Ads system, but were not allowed to solicit from other members in private messages.
 The entire club was inaccessible to the public Internet. Efforts were made to enhance privacy and security, and names of members were not revealed to the outside world.
 Activity was monitored to protect members from abuse or unpleasant situations, and there were Member Services Associates available online to help members at any time.

Media coverage
Netropolitan Club has been covered in International Business Times, the Los Angeles Times, the Express Tribune, NPR, Inc., and the Huffington Post.  A CNN commented that it sounded like "an elaborate ruse in an age when Facebook, Twitter and a host of other social networks are free".

References

American social networking websites